The Derby City Dynamite is a women's professional full-contact/tackle football team of the Women's Football Alliance that began play in 2012.  Based in Louisville, Kentucky, the Dynamite's home venue is John Hardin High School in Elizabethtown.

Season-by-season

|-
| colspan="6" align="center" | Derby City Dynamite (WFA)
|-
|2012 || 4 || 4 || 0 || 1st National North Central || --
|-
|2013 || 3 || 5 || 0 || 3rd National North Central || --
|-
|2014 || 4 || 6 || 0 || 2nd National Mideast || Lost National Conference Wild Card (West Michigan)
|-
|2015 || 0 || 8 || 0 || 5th National Great Lakes || --
|-
|2016 || 3 || 6 || 0 || 4th WFA2 National Southeast || --
|-
!Totals || 14 || 29 || 0
|colspan="2"| (including playoffs)

2012

Season schedule

2013

Season schedule

2014

Season schedule

2015

Season schedule

2016

Season schedule

See also
 Sports in Louisville, Kentucky

References

External links
 Derby City Dynamite official website
 Women's Football Alliance team website

Women's Football Alliance teams
Sports teams in Louisville, Kentucky
American football teams in Kentucky
American football teams established in 2012
Women's sports in Kentucky
2012 establishments in Kentucky
Women in Kentucky